Astrothelium aenascens is a species of corticolous (bark-dwelling) lichen in the family Trypetheliaceae. Found in Papua New Guinea, it was formally described as a new species in 2016 by André Aptroot. The type specimen was collected from Varirata National Park (Central Province), where it was found growing on smooth tree bark. The species epithet aenascens refers to the lichen's resemblance with Astrothelium aeneum. Thin-layer chromatography shows that the lichen contains an anthraquinone, which the author suggests is probably parietin.

References

aenascens
Lichen species
Lichens described in 2016
Lichens of New Guinea
Taxa named by André Aptroot